Delfina Gómez Álvarez (born 15 November 1962) is a Mexican politician affiliated with the National Regeneration Movement (MORENA). She served as the head of the Secretariat of Public Education appointed by President Andrés Manuel López Obrador. She served as a senator from the State of Mexico in the LXIV Legislature of the Mexican Congress. She also has served as a federal deputy and mayor.

Early life and academia 
Gómez was born in Texcoco and began her adult life as a teacher in the State of Mexico education system. In 1986, she earned her degree in Primary Education from the National Pedagogic University, which she paid for by caring for another family's three children; this was followed by master's degrees in pedagogy (in 1994) and in education (in 2001, from Monterrey Institute of Technology and Higher Education); additionally, she was active in the SMSEM union for state teachers. She directed the private Columbia School between 1991 and 1996. In 1998, she was named assistant deputy director of projects in the state Secretariat of Education; four years later, she became a school director, facing off against one of her colleagues to see who would be named director of the Nezahualcóyotl public school in the center of Texcoco, winning more than half of the 36 votes cast.

Political career 
In 2012, Gómez left education and entered politics. On the advice of Higinio Martínez Miranda, a former mayor of Texcoco and the Party of the Democratic Revolution (PRD)'s gubernatorial candidate in 1999, she ran for the municipal presidency of Texcoco as the joint candidate of Movimiento Ciudadano and the Labor Party, though she was not a member of either party. After winning the election, she served as the mayor of Texcoco from 2013 until February 2015, when she stepped down in order to begin a successful run as Morena's candidate for federal deputy from the 38th electoral district of the State of Mexico, which includes Texcoco. She sat on four commissions with one secretarial post, on the Commission for Strengthening Federalism.

2017 State of Mexico gubernatorial campaign
Gómez Álvarez took leave from the Chamber of Deputies on 15 January 2017 in order to run as the Morena candidate for Governor of the State of Mexico; her candidacy had been announced by the party's leader, Andrés Manuel López Obrador, in July 2016. López Obrador would appear at 40 of the 139 campaign events she conducted throughout the state.

The 2017 gubernatorial elections pitted Gómez Álvarez against Alfredo del Mazo Maza, of the dominant Institutional Revolutionary Party (PRI), as well as ex-presidential candidate Josefina Vázquez Mota of the National Action Party (PAN) and Juan Manuel Zepeda Hernández of the PRD. del Mazo won with a margin of nearly three percentage points, but the election was marred by allegations of electoral fraud and vote-buying committed by the PRI. Gómez stated that in certifying del Mazo's win, the Federal Electoral Tribunal (TEPJF), the national electoral court, confirmed "this fraud and this robbery".

2018 senatorial bid
After the gubernatorial campaign concluded, Gómez returned to the Chamber of Deputies in early October 2017 and took back the seat from her alternate, Magdalena Moreno Vega, who had served eight months in the post. Within a month, however, she was named as the party's state coordinator, putting her on track to be a Senate candidate in 2018. In February 2018, Gómez and Higinio Martínez Miranda—who had kickstarted Gómez's political career in 2012 and had since been re-elected as mayor of Texcoco—were announced as the Juntos Haremos Historia coalition's Senate candidates for the State of Mexico in the 2018 election. Despite winning on election day, Gómez may not remain long in the Senate, as according to party sources, she has been identified by President-elect López Obrador to become part of the incoming federal government; she would be replaced by her alternate, Martha Guerrero.

Secretary of Education 
On 21 December 2020, she was nominated for Secretary of Public Education (SEP). After the promotion and ratification by the Senate of Republic of Esteban Moctezuma as Mexican Ambassador in United States, Gómez was appointed as Secretary of Public Education by President Andrés Manuel López Obrador.

Legal issues 
In January 2022, the Electoral Court of the Federal Judiciary determined there was a "parallel financing scheme" for supporting the creation and activities of the political party National Regeneration Movement (MORENA) during the administration of Gómez Álvarez. Workers of the Texcoco municipality and the National System for Integral Family Development (DIF) received 90% of their salary. The party was fined with 4,529,224 pesos.

References

1962 births
Living people
Politicians from the State of Mexico
Women members of the Chamber of Deputies (Mexico)
Morena (political party) politicians
21st-century Mexican politicians
Women members of the Senate of the Republic (Mexico)
Women mayors of places in Mexico
21st-century Mexican women politicians
People from Texcoco, State of Mexico
Members of the Chamber of Deputies (Mexico) for the State of Mexico
Members of the Senate of the Republic (Mexico) for the State of Mexico
Deputies of the LXIII Legislature of Mexico
Senators of the LXIV and LXV Legislatures of Mexico
Cabinet of Andrés Manuel López Obrador